The Bellevue river (in French: rivière Bellevue) is a tributary of the rivière Pot au Beurre. It flows north in the municipalities of Saint-Robert and Sainte-Victoire, in the regional county municipality (MRC) of Pierre-De Saurel, in the administrative region of Montérégie, on the South Shore of St. Lawrence River, in Quebec, Canada.

The economic vocation of this hydrographic slope is essentially agricultural.

Geography 
The Lemoine River has its source in an agricultural zone which is close (north side) to the source of Petite rivière Bellevue, at the limit of municipalities of Sainte-Victoire and Saint-Robert. This source is located on east side of Chemin du Rang Bellevue.

  north in Saint-Robert, crossing the route 132 (route Marie-Victorin), in the hameau "Bellevue";
  north, to its mouth.

The mouth of the Bellevue river empties on the south shore of rivière Pot au Beurre, close to the limit between Saint-Robert and Yamaska.

Toponymy 
The toponym "rivière Bellevue" was made official on August 28, 1980, in the place name bank of the Commission de toponymie du Québec.

See also 
 List of rivers of Quebec

Notes and references

Further reading 
 

Rivers of Montérégie
Pierre-De Saurel Regional County Municipality